Coldham is a surname. Notable people with the surname include:

Alan Coldham (1906–1996), Australian tennis player
Iain Coldham (born 1965), British organic chemist
John Coldham (1901–1986), English schoolmaster and cricketer
Peter Wilson Coldham (1926–2012), British genealogist